Mount Aka may refer to:
 Mount Aka (Daisetsuzan), in Daisetsuzan National Park in Hokkaidō, Japan
 Mount Aka (Yatsugatake), in the Southern Yatsugatake Volcanic Group of the Yatsugatake Mountains in Honshū, Japan